Rebecq is a municipality of Wallonia located in the Belgian province of Walloon Brabant. On 1 January 2006 the municipality had 10,241 inhabitants. The total area is 39.08 km2, giving a population density of 262 inhabitants per km2.

The municipality consists of the following districts: Bierghes, Rebecq-Rognon, and Quenast.

Notable people
 François Huon is an artist of Rebecq.
 Ernest Solvay (b. Rebecq 1838 - Ixelles, 1922), chemist, industrialist and philanthropist.
 Irène Janssens
 Pierre Tilquin, founder of Gueuzerie Tilquin

Twin towns
 Monghidoro, Italy, from 2002

References

External links
 
Municipal website  (in French)

 
Municipalities of Walloon Brabant